Alyakhnovich (Lacinka: Aliachnovič) is a Belarusian surname, and may refer to:

 Frantsishak Alyakhnovich (1883–1944), Belarusian writer and journalist
 Edhar Alyakhnovich  (born 1987), Belarusian professional footballer

Belarusian-language surnames